Clark McConachy  (15 April 1895 – 12 April 1980), often known simply as Mac, was a New Zealand professional player of English billiards and snooker.

Life and career
McConachy was born at Glenorchy in Otago in 1895. He was the New Zealand professional billiards champion from 1914 until 1980.

He was runner-up in the Professional Billiards Championship to Joe Davis in 1932, and became champion in 1951 by defeating John Barrie 9,274-6,691. He also held the title unchallenged from 1951 until 1968, when at the age of 73 and afflicted by Parkinson's disease, he was narrowly defeated 5,234-5,499 by Rex Williams. His highest break at billiards was 1,943.

He was the runner-up in the World Snooker Championships of 1932 (losing to Davis, as he did in that year's world billiards championship) and 1952. McConachy scored one of the early snooker maximum breaks. He achieved it on Tuesday 19 February 1952 in a practice frame against Pat Kitchen at the Beaufort Club in London on a table reserved for professionals. An official of the Billiards Association and Control Council later examined the table and found it slightly over the standard size and so the break was not accepted as official. At the time Joe Davis held the record for the highest official break of 146. The match between McConachy and Horace Lindrum for the World Championship started the following Monday.

McConachy was a keen advocate of physical fitness and regularly ran up to four miles every day. A strict teetotaller and non-smoker, he attributed his continued success well into his senior years to these things. He was also well known for walking around the table on his hands before the match started. He is a member of the New Zealand Sports Hall of Fame. In the 1964 Queen's Birthday Honours, he was appointed a Member of the Order of the British Empire, for community and charitable services. He died at his residence in the Auckland suburb of Greenlane on 12 April 1980.

World championship finals

Billiards
 indicates challenge matches

Snooker

References

1895 births
1980 deaths
New Zealand snooker players
New Zealand players of English billiards
New Zealand Members of the Order of the British Empire
World champions in English billiards
People from Otago